Parliamentary elections were held in Serbia on 10 July 1905. The result was a victory for the Independent Radical Party, which won 81 of the 160 seats. Ljubomir Stojanović remained Prime Minister.

Results

References

Serbia
Parliamentary
Elections in Serbia
Serbia